Marissa Lee Neitling (born May 8, 1984) is an American actress, known for her roles in the TV series The Last Ship (2014-2018) as Kara Foster, and the film San Andreas (2015) as Phoebe.

Early life
Neitling was born in Lake Oswego, Oregon as Marissa Lee Neitling to Joy and Stanley Neitling. She has a younger sister named Mackenzie Neitling. Neitling graduated from Lake Oswego High School in 2002. She went on to get her undergrad at University of Oregon where she was also in the Honors College. Neitling is an avid Oregon Ducks fan. She was a double major in Math and Theater Arts. Neitling went on to earn an MFA in acting from the Yale School of Drama.

Career
In 2007, Neitling made a brief appearance in The Go-Getter. In 2011, Neitling was cast in a guest role spot on the hit series Leverage as Christina Valada / Lacey Beaumont. In 2014, she landed the role as Lt. Kara Foster on TNT summer series The Last Ship. In 2015, after sending in an audition tape, she was cast as Phoebe in the Dwayne Johnson-led film, San Andreas.

Filmography

Film

Television

References

External links

21st-century American actresses
American film actresses
American television actresses
Yale School of Drama alumni
1984 births
Living people
People from Lake Oswego, Oregon
University of Oregon alumni
Actresses from Oregon